Micrurus clarki, also known commonly as Clark's coral snake, is a species of venomous snake in the family Elapidae. The species is native to Central America and northwestern South America.

Etymology
The specific name, clarki, is in honor of Dr. Herbert Charles Clark (1877–1960), who was Director of Laboratories and Preventive Medicine for United Fruit Company, and then was Director of Gorgas Memorial Laboratory (1929–1954), in Panama.

Geographic range
M. clarki is found in western Colombia (Valle del Cauca Department), Panama (Darién Gap), and southeastern Costa Rica.

Habitat

Behavior
M. clarki is fossorial.

Reproduction
M. clarki is oviparous.

References

Further reading
Freiberg M (1982). Snakes of South America. Hong Kong: T.F.H. Publications. 189 pp. . (Micrurus clarki, p. 114).
Savage JM (2002). The Amphibians and Reptiles of Costa Rica: A Herpetofauna between Two Continents, between Two Seas. Chicago and London: University of Chicago Press. 954 pp. .
Schmidt KP (1936). "Notes on Central American and Mexican Coral Snakes". Zoological Series of Field Museum of Natural History 20: 205–216. (Micrurus clarki, new species, pp. 211–212).

clarki
Snakes of South America
Snakes of North America
Reptiles of Costa Rica
Reptiles of Panama
Reptiles of Colombia
Reptiles described in 1936